Frania Gillen-Buchert (born 13 November 1981) is a South African born, Scottish female former squash player. She made her international debut in 2000 and achieved her career best ranking of 53 in 2003.  Buchert graduated at the University of Stirling. 

Buchert competed at the Commonwealth Games in 2006, 2010 and 2014 representing Scotland. After the 2014 Commonwealth Games, she decided to retire from international squash competitions which also ended her 17 year career.

References 

1981 births
Living people
Scottish female squash players
Squash players at the 2006 Commonwealth Games
Squash players at the 2010 Commonwealth Games
Squash players at the 2014 Commonwealth Games
Commonwealth Games competitors for Scotland
Scottish people of South African descent
South African expatriate sportspeople in Scotland
Sportspeople from Cape Town
Alumni of the University of Stirling